John Henry Williams (June 21, 1887 – December 24, 1980) was an American economist. He was a professor of economics at Harvard University from 1921 to 1957. He was later appointed dean of the Graduate School of Public Administration at Harvard, and also served as Nathaniel Ropes Professor. In 1951, he was president of the American Economic Association. The John H. Williams Prize was established at Harvard in 1958.

References 

1887 births
1980 deaths
Brown University alumni
Harvard Graduate School of Arts and Sciences alumni
Harvard University faculty
Presidents of the American Economic Association
20th-century American economists
20th-century Welsh writers
20th-century American non-fiction writers
Welsh emigrants to the United States
People from Powys